Art Hansen (1929 – June 28, 2017) was an American artist from Vashon Island. Hansen was a native Washingtonian and achieved art degrees from the University of Washington and University of Minnesota.

Education
Hansen graduated in 1952 from the University of Washington. In 1957, he received an MFA degree from the University of Minnesota.

Career
Hansen had his first one-person show in 1952 at the Seattle Art Museum. In 1953, he was awarded a Fulbright grant to study etching at the Munich Academy of the Arts. In addition to printmaking, he worked in watercolor, oil paint, lithography, and pen and ink.

Collections
Hansen's work is represented in the permanent collections of the Seattle Art Museum, Tacoma Art Museum, the Portland Art Museum, among others.

References

1929 births
2017 deaths
University of Minnesota alumni
20th-century American male artists
University of Washington alumni
People from Vashon, Washington